Zhong Aifang is a Chinese lightweight rower. 

At the 1992 World Rowing Championships, she came fourth in the lightweight four. At the 1994 World Rowing Championships, she won silver in the double sculls. At the 1996 World Rowing Championships, she won gold in the lightweight four.

References

Chinese female rowers
Year of birth missing (living people)
World Rowing Championships medalists for China
Asian Games medalists in rowing
Asian Games gold medalists for China
Rowers at the 1994 Asian Games
Medalists at the 1994 Asian Games
Living people